John Edward Galley (born 7 May 1944) is an English former professional footballer who scored 149 goals from 409 games in the Football League playing as a centre forward for Wolverhampton Wanderers, Rotherham United, Bristol City, Nottingham Forest, Peterborough United and Hereford United during the 1960s and 1970s. He was part of the Hereford United side that won the Third Division title in 1976. After 14 seasons in the Football League, he dropped down into non-league football to play for Telford United.

Galley's older brothers Gordon and Maurice Galley also played in the Football League.

References

External links
 

1944 births
Living people
People from Clowne
Footballers from Derbyshire
English footballers
Association football forwards
Wolverhampton Wanderers F.C. players
Rotherham United F.C. players
Bristol City F.C. players
Nottingham Forest F.C. players
Peterborough United F.C. players
Hereford United F.C. players
Telford United F.C. players
English Football League players